Mehring books is the publishing house of the International Committee of the Fourth International. In addition to putting out its own titles, it maintains an online storefront selling historical works of the socialist movement.

Titles

Vadim Rogovin
Mehring Books has exclusive English publishing rights to the works of Soviet sociologist and historian Vadim Rogovin. It has thus far brought out two of his books in print.

Aleksandr Voronsky 
Mehring Books published a volume of the works of Soviet Literary Critic Aleksandr Voronsky in 1998. Leon Trotsky said that Voronsky was the greatest Soviet Literary Critic of his time. The volume was translated by Frederick Choate, a former professor of Slavic Literature and Languages at UC Davis.

Works of the Socialist Equality Party
The house has published a number of books by members of the Socialist Equality Party, particularly David North.

Tsar to Lenin
Mehring Books distributes Herman Axelbank's 1937 documentary Tsar to Lenin on DVD. The Socialist Equality Party claims that its predecessor, the Workers League, purchased the film from Axelbank in 1978.

References

External links
http://www.mehring.com/

Book publishing companies of the United States
!
Political book publishing companies
Publishing companies established in the 20th century